Andrew Vorhees (born January 21, 1999) is an American football offensive guard for the USC Trojans.

College career

After attending Kingsburg High School in Kingsburg, California, Vorhees committed to play college football for the USC Trojans in 2017. He was named as a first-team selection on the 2021 All-Pac-12 Conference football team. A super senior, Vorhees announced that he would return to USC in 2022. That season, he was named a first-team All-American and was the recipient of the Morris Trophy, awarded to the conference's best offensive lineman.

Professional career
On March 5, 2023, Vorhees participated in the 2023 NFL Combine. During one of the drills he tore his ACL; he was slated to be a second-to-third round pick.

References

External links

USC bio

Living people
American football offensive guards
USC Trojans football players
1999 births